De Grassi may refer to:

 Alex de Grassi (21st century), American Grammy Award-nominated fingerstyle guitarist
 Filippo De Grassi (1793–1877), an Italian-Canadian soldier who became a member of the Family Compact
 De Grassi Street, a side street located in Toronto, Ontario, Canada

See also
 Degrassi (disambiguation)
 Di Grassi, a surname